Charles Louis Mitchell (26 February 1859 – 30 May 1918) was a Scottish artist who gained a local reputation as a painter of landscapes and later of portraits. He was born in Laurencekirk on 26 February 1859. His father was David Mitchell, a farmer, and his mother, Mary Ferguson. He was educated in Montrose and Aberdeen before travelling to Germany where he studied art briefly. Initially, he worked as a bank clerk before joining the Dundee Graphic Art Association in 1891. He exhibited with them till 1900 and worked from a studio at 26 Ward Road, Dundee. He was commissioned to restore a collection of 18th century portraits belonging to Lord Gardenstone. One of his portraits (c. 1891) was of George B. Simpson who was doubtless one of his patrons. He married Agnes M. Baxter at Dundee on 31 July 1900. He visited the US frequently and eventually settled in Pittsburgh where he died on 30 May 1918.

References 

Scottish portrait painters
Landscape artists
1859 births
1918 deaths
People from Kincardine and Mearns
19th-century Scottish painters
Scottish male painters
20th-century Scottish painters
19th-century Scottish male artists
20th-century Scottish male artists